Ādaži Municipality is a municipality in the historical region of Vidzeme, and the Riga Planning Region in Latvia, which consists of Ādaži and Carnikava parishes plus the administrative centre, Ādaži. The municipality is located 25 km from the center of Riga.

The municipality was formed in 2006 from Ādaži Parish of Riga District and became a first level unit in 2009. After the 2021 administrative reform, Carnikava Municipality was merged into Ādaži Municipality.

Description

Geography 
Prior to 2021, the municipality consisted of the following villages: Alderi, Atari, Āņi, Baltezers, Birznieki, Garkalne, Kadaga, Stapriņi, Divezeri, Iļķene, Eimuri. The largest of them were Ādaži, Kadaga, Baltezers, Garkalne and Stapriņi. The total area is 162.9 km2.

A large part of the territory of Ādaži municipality consists of the Ādaži military training ground of the Latvian National Armed Forces. A notable geographical feature is the Gauja River, which flows into the Gulf of Riga within the borders of the municipality.

History and society 
The Ādaži Parish had been a historical municipal unit before and throughout the 20th century. The present borders of the unit were created in 1992 after the separation of Carnikava Parish.

The population is growing every year, reaching 12,000 at the beginning of 2020.

Symbols 
After the formation of the new municipality, a process to design a new coat of arms was launched in 2021. The previous coats of arms were re-used for both of the new parishes since 27 December 2021. Eventually, a design by Edgars Sims was selected, featuring the mouth of the Gauja River (in a pattern similar to the Latvian letter Ā) on a silver field and the Lobelia dortmanna (a flower common in the lakes of Ummis and Mazuika but otherwise endangered in Latvia) in silver and gold. The design was approved on 27 January 2022, making Ādaži the first newly created municipality to have approved a coat of arms.

The previous coat of arms of Ādaži Municipality was approved on March 28, 2012, by the decision of the Ministry of Culture of the Republic of Latvia No.3.1.-4/13. It was based on the coat of arms of Ādaži Parish approved on July 29, 1998, and registered in the Coat of Arms Register. It consisted of a green water lily leaf in a silver field, a white water rose flower in natural colors in the center and a green thread border. The symbol of Ādaži municipality indicated the Gauja river and the flora characteristic of the territory of the municipality. The white color of the water rose located in the center symbolizes clarity, wisdom, courage and support.

See also 
 Administrative divisions of Latvia

References 

 
Municipalities of Latvia
Vidzeme